Shilman (also Romanized as Shīlmān; also known as Shalmān) is a village in Nanur Rural District, Nanur District, Baneh County, Kurdistan Province, Iran. At the 2006 census, its population was 80, in 12 families. The village is populated by Kurds.

References 

Towns and villages in Baneh County
Kurdish settlements in Kurdistan Province